Group B of the 2004 Fed Cup Asia/Oceania Zone Group I was one of two pools in the Asia/Oceania Zone Group I of the 2004 Fed Cup. Four teams competed in a round robin competition, with the top two teams and the bottom two teams proceeding to their respective sections of the play-offs: the top teams play for advancement to the World Group Play-offs, while the bottom teams face potential relegation to Group II.

Indonesia vs. Uzbekistan

Chinese Taipei vs. India

Chinese Taipei vs. Uzbekistan

South Korea vs. India

Indonesia vs. Chinese Taipei

South Korea vs. Uzbekistan

Indonesia vs. India

Chinese Taipei vs. South Korea

Indonesia vs. South Korea

Uzbekistan vs. India

See also
Fed Cup structure

References

External links
 Fed Cup website

2004 Fed Cup Asia/Oceania Zone